Neasarta is a genus of moths of the family Crambidae. It contains only one species, Neasarta nyctichroalis, which is found in Sri Lanka.

References

Natural History Museum Lepidoptera genus database

Pyraustinae
Crambidae genera
Monotypic moth genera
Taxa named by George Hampson